is a Japanese footballer currently playing as a goalkeeper for Kashiwa Reysol.

Career statistics

Club
.

Notes

References

External links

1999 births
Living people
Japanese footballers
Japan youth international footballers
Association football goalkeepers
J3 League players
Kashiwa Reysol players
Kagoshima United FC players
Gamba Osaka players
Gamba Osaka U-23 players
Yokohama FC players